Alfred Steinhardt (June 1, 1923 – 2012) was an Israeli film director. His work includes shorts, documentaries, training films, and at least six feature films. He filmed a state-sponsored reenactment of the Six Day War that was released in 1968. His 1972 film Salomonico is a so-called Bourekas film and spawned the 1975 sequel The Father.

Filmography
Hill 24 Doesn't Answer (1955), one of the assistant directors
The Long Frontier (1966)
The Six Day War (1967), director, credited as consultant
Ha-Ben Ha'Oved (Hebrew: הבן העובד‎, lit. "The Prodigal Son") (1968) co-directed with Yosef ShalhinSalomonico / Salomoniko (1972)Haaba (1975)The Father (1975), a sequel to SalomonikoA Movie and Breakfast (1977)Messagest Hatzameret (1981)Az Men Git, Nemt Men'' (1982)

References

1923 births
2012 deaths
Israeli film directors